Jane Jenkins (born June 5, 1943) is an American casting director best known for her feature film work on Jurassic Park, Harry Potter and the Philosopher's Stone, A Few Good Men, Apollo 13, The Princess Bride, Ghost, and Home Alone. She has cast more than 190 film and television projects, primarily with her longtime casting partner, Janet Hirshenson.

Jenkins' first project as a casting director was for the 1980 independent feature film On The Nickel, written and directed by her then-boyfriend Ralph Waite.

Jenkins' and Hirshenson's work was instrumental in launching the careers of River Phoenix, Joaquin Phoenix, Robin Wright, Michael Keaton, Emma Watson, Daniel Radcliffe, Rupert Grint, John Cusack, Leonardo DiCaprio, Matt Damon, Winona Ryder, Jennifer Connelly, Brendan Fraser, Virginia Madsen, Meg Ryan, Benicio Del Toro, Jennifer Grey, Lea Thompson, Charlie Sheen, Tom Cruise, Ralph Macchio, Rob Lowe and Emilio Estevez.

Jenkins' and Hirshenson's last project together was the 2017 Rob Reiner film Shock and Awe.

Awards 
Fourteen feature films cast by Jenkins and Hirshenson were Oscar-nominated in the Best Actor and Best Actress categories, with three actors winning the award.

|-
! scope="row" | 1987
| Artios Award
| Outstanding Achievement in Casting for Feature Film, Drama
| Stand By Me
| 
|
|-
! scope="row" | 1988
| Artios Award
| Outstanding Achievement in Casting for Feature Film, Comedy
| The Princess Bride
| 
|
|-
! scope="row" | 1989
| Artios Award
| Outstanding Achievement in Casting for Feature Film, Drama
| Tucker: The Man and His Dream
| 
|
|-
! scope="row" | 1989
| Artios Award
| Outstanding Achievement in Casting for Feature Film, Drama
| Mystic Pizza
| 
| 
|-
! scope="row" | 1990
| Artios Award
| Outstanding Achievement in Casting for Feature Film, Comedy
| When Harry Met Sally...
| 
|
|-
! scope="row" | 1990
| Artios Award
| Outstanding Achievement in Casting for Feature Film, Comedy
| Parenthood
| 
| 
|-
! scope="row" | 1991
| Artios Award
| Outstanding Achievement in Casting for Feature Film, Comedy
| Home Alone
| 
|
|-
! scope="row" | 1994
| Artios Award
| Outstanding Achievement in Casting for Feature Film, Comedy
| Mrs. Doubtfire
| 
|
|-
! scope="row" | 1995
| Artios Award
| Outstanding Achievement in Casting for Feature Film, Drama
| My Family
| 
|
|-
! scope="row" | 1996
| Artios Award
| Outstanding Achievement in Casting for Feature Film, Drama
| Apollo 13
| 
|
|-
! scope="row" | 1999
| Artios Award
| Hoyt Bowers Award
| Outstanding Contribution to the Casting Profession
| 
|
|-
! scope="row" | 2002
| Artios Award
| Outstanding Achievement in Casting for Feature Film, Comedy
| Harry Potter and the Philosopher's Stone
| 
|
|-
! scope="row" | 2002
| Artios Award
| Outstanding Achievement in Casting for Feature Film, Drama
| A Beautiful Mind
| 
|
|-
! scope="row" | 2004
| Emmy Award
| Outstanding Casting for a Miniseries, Movie or a Special
| Iron Jawed Angels
| 
|
|-
! scope="row" | 2004
| Artios Award
| Outstanding Achievement in Casting for Feature Film, Comedy
| Something's Gotta Give
| 
|
|-
! scope="row" | 2009
| Artios Award
| Outstanding Achievement in Casting for Feature Film - Studio or Independent Drama/Comedy
| Frost/Nixon
| 
|

References 

American casting directors
Women casting directors
1943 births
Living people